Matteo Melara (born 8 July 1978 in Mirandola) was an Italian footballer who played for Serie A teams Livorno and Ascoli in the role of a defender. He is 187 cm tall.

On January 20, 2007 he played his first Ascoli Serie A game against Livorno

He mutually cancelled his contract with Torino F.C. in August 2008.

References

External links
 Matteo's profile from Gazetta dello Sport

1978 births
Living people
Italian footballers
U.S. Livorno 1915 players
Bologna F.C. 1909 players
Torino F.C. players
Association football defenders
Serie A players
People from Mirandola
Footballers from Emilia-Romagna
Sportspeople from the Province of Modena